Datuk Isnin bin Aliasnih (born 1 July 1966) is a Malaysian politician who has served as the State Assistant Minister of Housing and Local Government of Sabah in the Gabungan Rakyat Sabah (GRS) coalition under Chief Minister Hajiji Noor and Minister Masidi Manjun since October 2020 and Member of the Sabah State Legislative Assembly (MLA) for Klias since May 2018. He is a member of the Parti Gagasan Rakyat Sabah (GAGASAN), a component party of the GRS coalition and was a member of the Malaysian United Indigenous Party of Sabah (Sabah BERSATU), a former component party of GRS coalition.

Election results

Honours

Honours of Malaysia
  :
  Member of the Order of the Defender of the Realm (AMN) (2006)
  Officer of the Order of the Defender of the Realm (KMN) (2013)
  :
  Commander of the Order of Kinabalu (PGDK) - Datuk (2014)

References

Members of the Sabah State Legislative Assembly
Malaysian United Indigenous Party politicians
Living people
1966 births
Former United Malays National Organisation politicians
Members of the Order of the Defender of the Realm
Officers of the Order of the Defender of the Realm
Commanders of the Order of Kinabalu